Pandit Brij Mohan Dattatreya Kaifi Dehlavi (13 December 1866  1 November 1955) was an Indian Urdu language writer, poet, playwright, novelist and essayist.

Biography 
Brij Mohan Dattatreya Kaifi was born on 13 December 1866 in Delhi. He was a student of Altaf Hussain Hali in poesy. He was also well up in Hindi, Arabic, Persian, and English. He lived in Lahore for many years, where his son was an editor of The Tribune. Kaifi proved to be a great asset for Anjuman-i Taraqqi-i Urdu after Abdul Haq. He died on 1 November 1955 in Ghaziabad.

References 

Indian dramatists and playwrights
Indian novelists
20th-century Indian poets
1955 deaths
1866 births
People from Delhi